Alangium longiflorum is a tree in the dogwood family Cornaceae. The specific epithet  is from the Latin meaning "long flowers".

Description
The smooth bark is dark brown. The flowers are white.

Distribution and habitat
Alangium longiflorum grows naturally in Borneo and the Philippines. Its habitat is forests from sea-level to  altitude.

References

longiflorum
Trees of Borneo
Trees of the Philippines
Plants described in 1912
Taxonomy articles created by Polbot